The de Havilland DH.71 Tiger Moth was a British single-seat monoplane, designed to research high-speed flight and to test replacement engines for the Cirrus. Only two were built.

Design and development
It was a low-wing monoplane based on the earlier Moth biplanes with a stressed plywood covering and the cockpit designed around its test pilot, Hubert Broad, to make it as streamlined as possible: this resulted in the fuselage sides being sloped outwards to accommodate his shoulders. The Tiger Moth had a fixed conventional landing gear with a tail skid. The first aircraft built (registration G-EBQU) first flew from Stag Lane Aerodrome on 24 June 1927 and was fitted with an  ADC Cirrus II engine to check its handling characteristics. This was then replaced with Major Halford's prototype engine, by then named the Gipsy. The second example, G-EBRV, was fitted with a Cirrus engine and first flew on 28 July 1927.

Operational history
Both aircraft were entered for the 1927 King's Cup Race which was to be held at Hucknall on 30 July; 'QU was withdrawn but Broad flew 'RV in the race, retiring because of handling problems.

In August 1927 Broad flew G-EBQU over a 62-mile (100 km) closed-circuit to set a new record for Class III Light Aircraft of 186.47 mph (300.09 km/h). Five days later he flew to 19,191 ft (5,849 m) without oxygen in an attempt to break the altitude record for its category.

G-EBQU was exported to Australia in 1930 and registered VH-UNH.  On 17 September 1930 it crashed when the engine cut out while practising for an air race, killing pilot David Smith. The second airframe was for a time displayed outside de Havilland's Hatfield factory, eventually being destroyed there on 3 October 1940 during an air raid.

Specifications (G-EBRV)

See also

References

Bibliography

External links

 Video of Michael Maniatis' airworthy, full-scale reproduction DH.71 Tiger Moth racer

Racing aircraft
Single-engined tractor aircraft
Low-wing aircraft
DH.71 Tiger Moth
Aircraft first flown in 1927